The Landesliga Ost is together with the Landesliga West, the second-highest division of Tyrol and the fifth-highest division in Austrian football. The champions advance into the Tiroler Liga. In the 2015/16 season, SK Ebbs was able to secure the championship.

External links
 Landeliga Ost

References

Football competitions in Austria
Sport in Tyrol (state)